The year 1649 in science and technology involved some significant events.

Biology
 Publication of John Jonston's Historiae naturalis in Frankfurt begins with De piscibus et cetis.

Technology
 Johann Schröder publishes two methods for the production of elemental Arsenic.

Mathematics
 Frans van Schooten publishes the first Latin version of René Descartes' La Géométrie. His commentary makes the work understandable to the broader mathematical community. The Latin version also includes Florimond de Beaune's Notes brièves, the first important introduction to Descartes' cartesian geometry.

Events
 The semi-formal Oxford Philosophical Club of natural philosophers begins to meet; it is a predecessor of the Royal Society of London.

Births
 March 3 – John Floyer, English physician (died 1734)

Deaths
 September 6 – Robert Dudley, English-born navigator (born 1574)

References

 
17th century in science
1640s in science